Random coil index (RCI)  predicts protein flexibility by calculating an inverse weighted average of backbone secondary chemical shifts and predicting values of model-free order parameters as well as per-residue RMSD of NMR and molecular dynamics ensembles from this parameter.

The key advantages of this protocol over existing methods of studying protein flexibility are
 it does not require prior knowledge of a protein's tertiary structure,
 it is not sensitive to the protein's overall tumbling and
 it does not require additional NMR measurements beyond the standard experiments for backbone assignments.

The application of secondary chemical shifts to characterize protein flexibility is based on an assumption that the proximity of chemical shifts to random coil values is a manifestation of increased protein mobility, while significant differences from random coil values are an indication of a relatively rigid structure.

Even though chemical shifts of rigid residues may adopt random coil values as a result of comparable contributions of shielding and deshielding effects (e.g. from torsion angles, hydrogen bonds, ring currents, etc.), combining the chemical shifts from multiple nuclei into a single parameter allows one to decrease the influence of these flexibility false positives. The improved performance originates from the different probabilities of random coil chemical shifts from different nuclei being found among amino acid residues in flexible regions versus rigid regions. Typically, residues in rigid helices or rigid beta-strands are less likely to have more than one random coil chemical shift among their backbone shifts than residues in mobile regions.

The actual calculation of the RCI involves several additional steps including the smoothing of secondary shifts over several adjacent residues, the use of neighboring residue corrections, chemical shift re-referencing, gap filling, chemical shift scaling and numeric adjustments to prevent divide-by-zero problems. 13C, 15 N and 1H secondary chemical shifts are then scaled to account for the characteristic resonance frequencies of these nuclei and to provide numeric consistency among different parts of the protocol. Once these scaling corrections have been done, the RCI is calculated. The ‘‘end-effect correction’’ can also be applied at this point. The last step of the protocol involves smoothing the initial set of RCI values by three-point averaging.

See also
Chemical Shift
Chemical shift index
Protein dynamics
Protein NMR
NMR
Nuclear magnetic resonance spectroscopy
Protein nuclear magnetic resonance spectroscopy
Protein dynamics#Domains and protein flexibility
Protein

References

Nuclear magnetic resonance
Nuclear magnetic resonance software
Protein methods
Protein structure
Biophysics
Scientific techniques
Chemistry software